Sarasota is a city in Sarasota County on the Gulf Coast of the U.S. state of Florida. The area is renowned for its cultural and environmental amenities, beaches, resorts, and the Sarasota School of Architecture. The city is located in the southern end of the Greater Tampa Bay Area and north of Fort Myers and Punta Gorda. Its official limits include Sarasota Bay and several barrier islands between the bay and the Gulf of Mexico. Sarasota is a principal city of the Sarasota metropolitan area, and is the seat of Sarasota County. According to the 2020 U.S. census, Sarasota had a population of 54,842.

The Sarasota city limits contain several keys, including Lido Key, St. Armands Key, Otter Key, Casey Key, Coon Key, Bird Key, and portions of Siesta Key. Longboat Key is the largest key separating the bay from the gulf, but it was evenly divided by the new county line of 1921. The portion of the key that parallels the Sarasota city boundary that extends to that new county line along the bayfront of the mainland was removed from the city boundaries at the request of John Ringling in the mid-1920s, who sought to avoid city taxation of his planned developments at the southern tip of the key. Although they never were completed in the quickly faltering economy, those development concessions granted by the city never were reversed and the county has retained regulation of those lands.

The city limits expanded significantly with the real estate rush of the early twentieth century, reaching almost . The wild speculation boom began to crash in 1926 and the city limits began to contract, shrinking to less than a quarter of that area.

History 

The area known today as Sarasota appeared on a sheepskin Spanish map from 1763 with the word  over present-day Sarasota and Bradenton. The origin’s of the name is disputed, with some claiming that it is based on conquistador Hernando de Soto’s daughter Sara, and others claiming that it comes from “sara-de-cota,” meaning “an area of land easily observed” in the language of the Calusa indigenous tribe. Around 1883 to 1885, The Florida Mortgage And Investment Company Of Edinburgh bought 60,000 acres for development in what is now the City of Sarasota.  Many Scottish people began to arrive in Sarasota in December 1885. The municipal government of Sarasota was established when it was incorporated as a town in 1902.  John Gillespie was the first Mayor. When reincorporated with a city form of government, A. B. Edwards became the first mayor of the city.

Geography and climate 
Sarasota has a tropical climate with hot, humid summers and warm, drier winters. There are distinct rainy and dry seasons, with the rainy season lasting from March to November and the dry season from December to February.

Demographics 

As of the 2020 census, Sarasota city had a population of 54,842 with 25,209 households.

Of that population, 3.9% were under 5 years old, 14.6% were under 18 years old, and 28.0% were 65 years and older. 52.5% of the population were female persons. 

77.7% of the population were white, 15.2% were black or African American, 0.3% were American Indian and Alaskan Native, 2.1% were Asian, 3.7% were two or more races, and 16.6% were Hispanic or Latino. 

4,056 veterans lived in the city and 16.7% of the population were Foreign born persons. 

The median gross rent was $1,177. 92.5% of the households had a computer and 84.2% of the households had a broadband internet subscription. 

90.0% of the population over 25 years were high school graduates or higher, and 37.2% of the population over 25 years had a Bachelor’s degree or higher.

The median household income was $56,093 with a per capita income of $43,387. 15.6% of the population lived below the poverty threshold.

Government 
Sarasota municipal government was incorporated in 1913, changing from a town type to adopting the city type of local government found in the United States and the title of its government changed to "City of Sarasota". Sarasota later was designated as the county seat when Sarasota County was carved out of Manatee County in 1921 during the creation of several new counties. In 1945 the commission-manager government form was adopted for the city and it is governed by a five-person commission elected by popular vote, two members of which serve in the ceremonial positions of "mayor" and "vice-mayor", as chosen by the commission every April. Two at-large commissioners are elected by all voters and the city is divided into three districts for which the residents of each elect one district representative to the five member commission.

Many aspects of the city are overseen by the county government ranging from the schools, the libraries, the bay, major waterways, county-designated roads, the airport, fire departments, property and ad valorem taxes, voting, the health department, extension services, stormwater control, mosquito control, the courts, and the jail. Therefore, the election of county commissioners is important to city voters.

The city's adoption of its "no lodging out-of-doors" ordinance on August 15, 2005, Ordinance No. 05-4640, made it illegal to sleep outside on public property without permission.

Arts and culture

Performing arts

Sarasota has many musical, dance, theatre, circus and other performing arts venues, including the Sarasota Ballet, Sarasota Opera, Asolo Repertory Theatre, Florida Studio Theatre, the Players Centre for Performing Arts, Westcoast Black Theatre Troupe, Urbanite Theatre, Sarasota Contemporary Dance, Sarasota Orchestra, La Musica, Jazz Club of Sarasota, Sarasota Youth Opera, Circus Arts Conservatory and many others.

Theatrical venues include Florida Studio Theatre, Asolo Repertory Theatre, Van Wezel Performing Arts Hall, The Players Theatre, Urbanite Theatre, and the Westcoast Black Theatre Troupe.

In 1925, A. B. Edwards built a theater that could be adapted for either vaudeville performances or movie screenings. Renowned stripper Sally Rand did her bubble bath and fan dance here. Tommy Dorsey, Will Rogers and Elvis Presley each performed at the Edward Theatre. It remains at the intersection of Pineapple Avenue and Second Street, having been restored and used for performances by the Sarasota Opera and others. It is listed on the National Register of Historic Places.

In the early 1950s, the John and Mable Ringling Museum of Art purchased a historic Italian theater, the "Asolo" (now called the Historic Asolo Theater). This theatre was originally built for Queen Caterina of Cyprus’ palace in Asolo, Italy in 1798 but was dismantled in 1931. A. Everett "Chick" Austin, the museum's first director, arranged the purchase and reassembly of the theater for performances of plays and opera.

In the 1960s philanthropists Lewis and Eugenia Van Wezel enabled the city to build a performing arts hall on the bayfront. The auditorium, the Van Wezel Performing Arts Hall, was designed by Frank Lloyd Wright's successor firm, Taliesin Associated Architects team under the direction of William Wesley Peters. Wright's widow, Olgivanna Lloyd Wright, who participated in the project, selected its purple color.

In 1989, Stuart Barger, a local architect, designed and oversaw the construction of another Asolo Theater, housed in the Florida State University Center for the Performing Arts. It is a multi-theater complex, located farther east on the John and Mable Ringling Museum of Art property, being placed between Bay Shore Road and Tamiami Trail, and facing south toward Ringling Plaza. It was built around a rococo, historic Scottish theater previously called the Dunfermline Opera House, which had been shipped to Florida. The complex provides venues and facilities for students of Florida State University's MFA Acting program, the FSU/Asolo Conservatory for Actor Training. This was the administrative home of the Sarasota French Film Festival for several years.

Florida Studio Theatre's Keating Theatre, formerly the Sarasota Woman's Club, is amongst the oldest surviving buildings in Sarasota.  Founded in 1903, the Sarasota Woman's Club eventually set out to create a meeting place to house social events, activities, and forums. On January 1, 1915, the cornerstone was laid at the corner of Palm Avenue and Park Street (now Cocoanut). It served as the town's first library and hosted numerous clubs and public committee gatherings. The Woman's Club also maintained a census and birth registration, an area PTA, and a Red Cross Auxiliary.

The Sarasota Woman's Club relocated in 1976 and the building became slated for demolition. Marian McKenna, a patron, and supporter of the arts, did not want to see the building and her memories destroyed. She purchased the building and later sold it to Florida Studio Theatre.

In 1985, the Sarasota Woman's Club building was added to the National Register of Historic Places. After completing more renovations to the historic building in 2003, the theatre was renamed the Keating Theatre in honor of Ed and Elaine Keating, and in 2004, additional lobby space was built in the theatre - the Bea Friedman Room. FST's Keating Theatre now seats 173 and remains a cultural center of Sarasota.

In 2003, FST purchased the Gompertz Theatre. The building was originally the Park-Seventh Movie House in the 1920s. Due to the Depression, the movie house shut its doors and became an empty venue. During its predominantly vacant period in the 1940s, the theatre hosted a variety of roadshows and performers, including Tom Mix and his Wonder Horse and the All Girls’ Orchestra. During this time it was known as the Garden Theater, and later the Art Theater, before becoming known as the Palm Tree Playhouse in 1951. The Playhouse closed again in the 1960s. In the mid-1970s, Asolo Theatre purchased the space for production purposes and their Stage Two Theatre program. It was subsequently sold to Anita Katzman and reoccupied by Siesta Key Actors Theatre and Theatre Works in the 1980s. The building was acquired by Florida Studio Theatre and renamed the Gompertz Theatre in honor of Mrs. Leila Gompertz, who made the lead gift enabling the purchase.

Other Sarasota cultural attractions include, and many other musical, dance, artistic, and theatrical venues.

Music

Sarasota is the home of the Sarasota Orchestra, which was founded by Ruth Cotton Butler in 1949 and known for years as the Florida West Coast Symphony. It holds a three-week Sarasota Music Festival that is recognized internationally and boasts it attracts renowned teachers and the finest students of chamber music.
Sarasota also boasts a symphonic chorus, Key Chorale, and professional vocal ensemble, Choral Artists of Sarasota. The Jazz Club of Sarasota is one of the largest and most active jazz clubs in the United States and has promoted jazz events in Sarasota for 39 years. 
Elvis Presley, Tommy Dorsey and Gregg Allman each played concerts in Sarasota.

Joe Perry of Aerosmith, Brian Johnson of AC/DC, Dickey Betts of the Allman Brothers Band, Donald Dunn of the Blues Brothers and Graeme Edge of the Moody Blues have all settled in Sarasota.

Visual arts

Sarasota and the Cultural Coast are home to fine art, film-making, and decorative arts. Fine art, fine art galleries, artist collectives, film-making, and many decorative arts are practiced in Sarasota and Cultural Coast. The Sarasota Art Museum and the Ringling Museum are both in Sarasota.

Film

In 1952, Cecil B. DeMille filmed and premiered The Greatest Show on Earth (with James Stewart, Charlton Heston, Betty Hutton) in Sarasota.

In 1998, two studio films were filmed in Sarasota: Alfonso Cuaron’s Great Expectations, with Ethan Hawke, Gwyneth Paltrow, Hank Azaria, Anne Bancroft and Robert De Niro; and Volker Schlondorff’s Palmetto, starring Woody Harrelson, Elisabeth Shue, and Gina Gershon.

Out of Time (2003), a crime drama starring Denzel Washington and Eva Mendes used the Casey Key Swing Bridge, Boca Grande and Cortez. In 2013, Taylor Hackford’s action movie Parker, with Jason Statham, Jennifer Lopez, Nick Nolte had scenes filmed at Ca’ d’Zan in Sarasota.

In June 2017, director Kevin Smith shot his 2022 film, KillRoy Was Here, in Sarasota.

Aquarium, zoos and botanical gardens

Sarasota is home to Mote Marine Laboratory, a marine rescue, research facility, an aquarium, the Marie Selby Botanical Gardens, the Sarasota Jungle Gardens and the Big Cat Habitat & Gulf Coast Sanctuary.

Festivals
Since 1998, the city has hosted the Sarasota Film Festival annually. The festival attracts independent films from around the world. It claims to be one of Florida's largest film festivals. In 2009 the annual Ringling International Arts Festival, held its premier and held its closing event in the historic Asolo theater, which had been moved and rebuilt again. The historic Venetian theater now is housed in the reception building for the museum where it is used for special events as well as performances, informative purposes, and another seasonal film series hosted by the museum.

Florida Studio Theatre produces the annual Sarasota Improv Festival. Founded in 2009 by Rebecca Hopkins, FST's annual Sarasota Improv Festival brings together the best improvisers from across the country and around the world for a whirlwind weekend of spontaneous creativity. The Festival has become a destination event, drawing thousands of people from across the state of Florida and beyond. Past performers have come from as far as Mexico, Canada, Spain, France, and the United Kingdom to perform on Florida's Gulf Coast.

In 2010, the Sarasota Chalk Festival that is held yearly in the historic area of Burns Square became the first international street painting festival in the United States of America. Celebrating the sixteenth century performance art of Italian street painting, the festival hosted Maestro Madonnaro Edgar Mueller from Germany, who created the first street painting that changed images from day to night. The festival has a different theme each year and has introduced new techniques in street art. Other applications of street art such as murals and "cellograff graffiti" have become companion events also produced by Avenida de Colores, Inc. The murals are part of the "Going Vertical" project and although it sometimes coincides with the chalk festival, it is distinct from it and often continues throughout the year. Except for a few commissioned on public property in the Palm Avenue Parking Garage, the murals are on private property and they are in many sections of Sarasota and in Manatee County as well.  the Sarasota Chalk festival has relocated to Venice, FL, a small town just South of Sarasota. The name Sarasota Chalk Festival remains the same.

It is also home to the Harvey Milk Festival, an independent music festival in support of civil rights, focusing on the LGBTQ community. It has been celebrated in May annually since 2010 on the weekend closest to Harvey Milk's birthday, and is currently the largest independent music festival in Sarasota, with thousands of attendees throughout the free, public, multi-day event, that also includes gallery showings, film, and other live performances.

Architecture 
Italian architecture and culture are present in the area including at the Ringling Museum. A large number of homes and buildings are designed in the Italian style, especially Venetian as influenced by Ringling's Cà d'Zan. Italian inspired statues are also common and Michelangelo's David is used as the symbol of Sarasota.

Sarasota School of Architecture 
The Sarasota School of Architecture developed as a variant of mid-century modernist architecture. It incorporates elements of both the Bauhaus and Frank Lloyd Wright's "organic" architecture. The style developed as an adaptation to the area's sub-tropical climate and used newly emerging materials that were manufactured or implemented following World War II.

Historic buildings and sites 

By the end of the twentieth century, many of Sarasota's more modest historical structures were demolished. Recently, two historic buildings, the Crocker Church and the Bidwell-Wood House (the oldest remaining structure in the city), first restored by Veronica Morgan and members of the Sarasota Alliance for Historic Preservation that she founded, became city property. These structures were relocated to this park, despite protests from residents who objected to the loss of park area.

In the late 1970s, Sarasota County purchased the Terrace Hotel that was built by Charles Ringling and renovated it for use as a county government office building. The adjacent courthouse that he donated to the new county in 1921 has been listed on the National Register of Historic Places. The courthouse complex was designed by Dwight James Baum.

In the next decade the landmark hotel built by Owen Burns, the El Vernona, which had been turned into apartments became endangered. By then it was called the John Ringling Towers and was purchased by a phosphate miner, Gardinier, who wanted to turn it into his corporate headquarters. All of the tenants were turned out and plans were made for the restoration of the building. The city commissioners supported the plan initially, but lobbying to undermine the project began and one of the commissioners changed her vote. The project was denied at the final hearing. The enraged miner abandoned the city and subsequent owners, seeking to demolish it, made garish changes to the building to make it unappealing before finally leaving it open for vagrants to invade and pilfer.

Remarkable preservation success occurred during the 1990s when the community exhibition hall, the Municipal Auditorium, designed by Thomas Reed Martin and Clarence A. Martin, was listed on the National Register of Historic Paces and meticulously restored to its depression recovery era, 1937 WPA community project, completion status and its architectural glory—both inside and out. The city boasts that 100,000 people use it every year and it is a boon to the community for recreation, lawn sports, as well as being heavily attended for auctions, concerts, conventions, flea markets, galas, graduations, lectures, orchid and flower shows, and a full range of trade shows of interest to the community. Later the Federal Building, designed by George Albee Freeman (the designer of Seagate for industrialist Powell Crosley Jr.) and Louis A. Simon, which initially had served as the post office was restored as well.

Most of the luxurious historic residences from the 1920s boom period along the northern shore of Sarasota Bay also have survived. This string of homes, built on large parcels of elevated land along the widest point of the bay, is anchored by the John and Mable Ringling Museum of Art at its center. Among them is Cà d'Zan, the home of Mable and John Ringling, which was restored recently.

Many significant structures from the comparatively recent "Sarasota School of Architecture" period of the mid-twentieth century, however, have not survived. Since they do not qualify under the age criteria set for historic preservation nominations their historical aspect often escapes public recognition. Others frequently are threatened by demolition plans for new development without consideration of their cultural and historical importance to the community instead of motivating the implementation of plans to retain the buildings and integrate them into new plans.

In 2006, the Sarasota County School Board slated one of Paul Rudolph's largest Sarasota projects, Riverview High School, for demolition. The board arrived at the decision despite protests by many members of the community, including architects, historic preservationists, and urban planners. Others supported the demolition as they believed the structure is no longer functional. The issue was divisive. The World Monuments Fund included the school on its 2008 Watch List of 100 Most Endangered Sites in the category Main Street Modern.

Following a March 2007 charrette led by the National Trust for Historic Preservation, a proposal was advanced to renovate and preserve Rudolph's buildings. The school board decided to allow a year to consider implementation of the innovative plan proposed to preserve the buildings, that would include building a parking garage with playing fields above it rather than demolishing the structures. In early June 2008, the school board voted in a 3–2 decision to allow the demolition; School board members Shirley Brown, Caroline Zucker and Frank Kovatch voted against preserving the historic high school. This decision was that school would be demolished and that a parking lot would replace it. One year later, in June 2009, Riverview High School was demolished.

In December 2019, a former Sarasota High School facility was transformed into the Sarasota Art Museum of Ringling College. The 93-year-old building was renovated to include 80,000 square feet for the museum's campus with about 15,000 square feet for exhibitions, costing about $30 million according to the president of Ringling College, Larry Thompson.

Other notable cultural features 
The Sarasota neighborhood of Pinecraft is home to a relatively liberal Amish community which is unusual compared to other Amish communities as it consists mainly of elderly who moved to Florida because of its mild climate, of Amish people who are on holiday and of Amish who do not fit in easily in other communities. Breaking Amish: Brave New World, a television series of scripted reality is set in Pinecraft. It is a spin-off of Breaking Amish.

The Rosemary District was an African American community and is home to the Boulevard of the Arts. Newtown is predominantly and historically African American.

Education

Public education 
Public education is provided and managed by the Sarasota County Public Schools school district.

Elementary schools in Sarasota include the following:

 Alta Vista Elementary
 Ashton Elementary
 Bay Haven School of Basics Plus
 Brentwood Elementary
 Emma E. Booker Elementary
 Fruitville Elementary
 Gocio Elementary
 Gulf Gate Elementary
 Lakeview Elementary
 Laurel Nokomis School
 Phillippi Shores Elementary
 Southside Elementary
 Tatum Ridge Elementary
 Tuttle Elementary
 Wilkinson Elementary

Middle schools include Booker Middle, Brookside Middle, Laurel Nokomis, McIntosh Middle, and Sarasota Middle.

High schools include Booker High, Riverview High, Sarasota High, Suncoast Polytechnical High School, Sarasota Military Academy, and Oak Park School.

Sarasota was also home to the Flint School, a type of boating school.

Private education 
 The Classical Academy of Sarasota
 Sarasota Christian

Higher education 

Sarasota is home to New College of Florida, a public liberal arts college and the honors college for the State University System of Florida.

Additional colleges in Sarasota include Keiser University of Sarasota (a private, not for profit university); FSU/Asolo Conservatory for Actor Training (Florida State University's MFA Acting Conservatory in conjunction with the Asolo Repertory Theatre); Ringling College of Art and Design, a school of visual arts and design; and satellite campuses of Eckerd College, based in St. Petersburg, Florida; and Florida State University College of Medicine, based in Tallahassee, Florida. Other colleges in the city include East West College of Natural Medicine, an accredited college of acupuncture and Chinese medicine.

Nearby educational institutions with regional draw include State College of Florida, Manatee-Sarasota, and a commuter branch of the University of South Florida, with the main campus located in Tampa.

Media

Television 
Sarasota is part of the Nielsen-designated Tampa-Saint Petersburg-Sarasota television market. The local television stations are ABC-affiliate WWSB and the SNN: Suncoast News Network, a continuous local cable news operation run by Comcast, Frontier FiOS and the Sarasota Herald-Tribune. WWSB is the only network station with studios in Sarasota. Other network and public television programming serving the community is offered by Fort Myers and Tampa television stations. Comcast provides cable television service. DirecTV and Dish Network direct broadcast satellite television including Tampa Bay Area local and national channels to Sarasota residents.

Radio 
Arbitron has identified the Sarasota-Bradenton radio market as the seventy-third largest market in the country, and the sixth largest in the state of Florida. There are eight radio stations in the city: WSMR (89.1FM, classical music), WSLR-LP (96.5FM, variety-talk and community issues), WKZM (104.3FM, religious; repeating WKES Lakeland), WSRZ (107.9FM, oldies), WLSS (930AM, talk), WSRQ (1220AM, 98.9FM, 106.9FM, talk), WTMY (1280AM, talk), WTZB (105.9FM, rock music; commonly known as The Buzz) and WSDV (1450AM, adult standards). WHPT (102.5 FM, Hot Talk) and WRUB (106.5FM, Spanish) are licensed to Sarasota and have broadcasting facilities in the Sarasota / Bradenton area, but have studios in the Tampa Bay area and are focused on that region.

The community also is served by most radio stations from the Tampa Bay radio market, as well as some stations from the nearby Fort Myers radio market.

Newspaper 
The Sarasota Herald-Tribune is the daily newspaper published in the city and the weekly newspaper is the Sarasota Observer. From neighboring Manatee County, the Bradenton Herald also is distributed daily in the area and The Bradenton Times is an electronic weekly newspaper that covers Sarasota topics as well. Sarasota Magazine also served the community.

Sports and recreation

Sports

Stadiums 
In 1937 the Municipal Auditorium-Recreation Club was built with funds provided by the Works Progress Administration, the municipal government, and local residents and business owners. It became a center for sports, entertainment, and recreation. The sports activities have ranged from badminton, basketball, boating, lawn bowling, and shuffleboard, to tennis. The auditorium hosts clubs for cards, dancing, games, gardening, and numerous hobbies as well as having become the community meeting place for commercial and educational shows and the venue for local schools and charities to hold events and dances. Tourists are attracted to exhibitions provided by local businesses as well as vendors from national circuits. This building was listed in the National Register of Historic Places because of its architecture and for providing the enormous range of community activities that are scheduled at it every week.

Sarasota is home to Ed Smith Stadium where the Baltimore Orioles have held spring training since 2010. The Orioles also have minor league facilities at the Buck O’Neil Baseball Complex at Twin Lakes Park.  Previously, Ed Smith Stadium was the spring training home of the Cincinnati Reds and the minor league Sarasota Reds.

Golf 

The warm climate helped the Sarasota area become a popular golf destination. John Hamilton Gillespie was an early pioneer of the game in Sarasota. The Sara Bay course in the Whitfield area was designed by golf architect Donald Ross. Bobby Jones was associated with the community course in Sarasota. Many courses dot the area, including the one originally laid out for the hotel John Ringling planned on the southern tip of Longboat Key.

Fishing 
Sport fishing attracted enthusiasts to Sarasota and the area because of the amazing bounty of the bay. Tarpon was the biggest draw, but gigantic gar as well as many other species abounded to attract people such as Owen Burns and Powel Crosley. The first settled permanently and became one of the most important developers of Sarasota and the second, who more typically, built a winter retreat here and participated in the sport via the clubs, organizations, and tournaments focused on fishing.

Marathon 
The Sarasota Marathon started in 2005. In 2010, declining sponsorship and marathon registration led organizers to change the event to a half marathon. The race begins and ends near the John and Mable Ringling Museum.

Swimming 

Sarasota is home to two swim teams. The Sarasota Sharks have won national championships. A newer team, the Sarasota Tsunami, was founded by the former Sharks head coach and is also nationally competitive. The teams maintain a rivalry.

Sailing 
The Sarasota Sailing Squadron is a highly active facility that has hosted many nationally renowned regattas for both dinghies and larger vessels.

Football 
In 2013, Sarasota became the home of the Sarasota Thunder, which was to play in the Ultimate Indoor Football League, but the team folded.

2014 Pentathlon World Cup Final 
In 2014, Sarasota hosted the modern pentathlon World Cup Final.

2017 World Rowing Championships 
Benderson Park in Sarasota was  the venue for the World Rowing Championships in 2017, held on  September 23 – October 1, 2017.

2021 U-18 Baseball World Cup 
Sarasota and Bradenton together held the 2021 U-18 Baseball World Cup.

Other recreational activities 
Sarasota is home of the Whiskey Obsession Festival, the largest whiskey festival in Florida. Established in 2013, the festival features several hundred whiskies from around the world. Dozens of professional brand ambassadors and distillers participate in the festival by participating in a panel discussion, leading classes and tastings.

Transportation

Airports 
The major airport in the area is Sarasota-Bradenton International Airport which is shared by Sarasota and Manatee counties. Since being opened in 1941, it has been the area's major airport. Before this, Lowe's Field functioned as the main airport for the Sarasota Area from 1929 to 1941. 

Five airlines offer service out of the airport to locations primarily in the United States and Canada. The airport serves more than 1,300,000 passengers per year. The airport holds full port of entry status providing U.S. Customs inspections for international travelers. St. Petersburg-Clearwater International Airport and Tampa International Airport are located about an hour north from Sarasota, and Southwest Florida International Airport in Ft. Myers an hour and 45 min south of Sarasota. All 3 offer a wider range of national and international flights.

Public transit 
Sarasota County Area Transit has a bus service called SCAT which offers service throughout the county and also offers limited connections with Manatee County Area Transit. Sarasota County has joined the Tampa Bay Area Regional Transportation Authority to plan and build future transportation infrastructure including light rail, commuter rail and longer range bus service.

Rail 
A key issue is providing Sarasota with access to the Florida High Speed Rail. The Seaboard Coast Line ran intercity train service to the city until 1971. A freight-only rail line operated by Seminole Gulf Railway does serve industries in Sarasota. The Seaboard Coast Line ran the last passenger train, the West Coast Champion, to the company's depot on 1971.

Water 
As a city located on the Gulf of Mexico, water transportation is a key consideration. The Intracoastal Waterway is a  waterway providing water access to and from the Atlantic coast for tugs, barges and leisure boats. Port Manatee and the Port of Tampa both provide nearby deep water ports. Port Manatee provides cargo service primarily while the Port of Tampa is more diverse. Port Manatee formerly even had a cruise line, Regal Cruise Line from 1993–2003. It was seized by U.S Marshals on April 18, 2003, for not being maintained. The waterway enters Sarasota Bay which provides access to downtown Sarasota at the city pier.

Roads 
Because of its location on the Gulf of Mexico and its proximity to several other large metropolitan areas, road transportation is critical to the Sarasota area. The major roads in the area include:
  U.S. 41 Tamiami Trail – a major north-south route through Sarasota enters the city from the south before heading west at the south end of U.S. 301; after briefly following Bayfront Drive the Trail heads north again paralleling the coast 
  U.S. 301 – heading north from its intersection with U.S. 41, U.S. 301 follows Washington Boulevard running parallel to U.S. 41 until the two roads merge again in Manatee County
  SR 780 – Fruitville Road (Third Street) – a main east-west thoroughfare linking U.S. 41, U.S. 301, and Interstate 75 
  SR 789 – starts out as John Ringling Causeway before heading to Bird Key and Lido Key, SR 789 turns north and becomes Gulf of Mexico Drive, a major road on the islands between Sarasota and Bradenton

Notable people 

 Erik Arroyo, former Mayor of Sarasota and lawyer
 Doug Band, assistant to Bill Clinton and businessman. Helped found the Clinton Global Initiative and assisted with the Clinton Foundation after his presidency
 Freddie Bartholomew, 1930s child actor
 Roy Basler (1906–1989), historian
 Dickey Betts, guitarist and founding member of The Allman Brothers Band
 Daniel Bukantz (1917–2008), Olympic fencer
 Eugene A. Burdick, North Dakota Fifth Judicial District judge and surrogate judge for the North Dakota Supreme Court
 William J. Burns, Director of the Bureau of Investigation, later the Federal Bureau of Investigation
 Flossie M. Byrd, home economist and academic
 Barber Conable, New York state senator, U.S representative from New York, and World Bank President under President Ronald Reagan
 Marlow Cook, U.S senator from Kentucky
 Eric Curran, racing driver
 Ian Desmond, professional baseball player for the Colorado Rockies
 Lois Duncan, writer, novelist, poet, and journalist
 Sonia Pressman Fuentes, lawyer; author and co-founder of National Organization for Women
 Jackie Gerlich, dwarf actor and circus entertainer
 Brian Gottfried (born 1952), tennis player, reached Nº3 in the world in 1977
 Carla Gugino (born 1971), actress
 Dalton Guthrie (born 1995), Major League Baseball player for the Phillies
 James A. Haley, U.S. representative from Florida and member of the Florida House of Representatives. Vice-president and later president of the Ringling Bros. and Barnum & Bailey Circus. Delegate to the Democratic National Convention in 1952, 1956, and 1960
 Denver David Hargis, U.S representative from Kansas
 Forest Harness, U.S representative from Indiana and Sergeant at Arms of the Senate
 Ian Hornak, founding artist of the Hyperrealist and Photorealist fine art movements. Owned a winter home in Sarasota from 1985 to 2001.
 Tim Jaeger, artist
 Brian Johnson, lead singer of AC/DC
 Josh Kaufman, soul singer and singer-songwriter
 Margaret Kerry, actress, radio host, and model for Tinker Bell in the 1953 Walt Disney film Peter Pan
 Stephen King, author
 David Lawrence, publisher; founded what would later become U.S. News & World Report
 La Norma Fox, trapeze artist in RBB Circus and Sarasotan from 1949 onwards
 Mirjana Lučić-Baroni, professional tennis player
 Jes Macallan, actress
 John D. MacDonald, crime novelist
 Marlon Mack, running back for the Indianapolis Colts of the National Football League
 Myka Meier, etiquette coach and writer
 Eric Minkin (born 1950), American-Israeli basketball player
 Daniel Myrick, director of horror films 
 Bello Nock, daredevil and circus performer 
 Carol Perkins, fashion model
 Jack Perkins, reporter, commentator, war correspondent, and anchorman
 Joe Perry, lead guitarist of Aerosmith
 Paul Reubens, actor known for creating and portraying Pee-wee Herman
 Michael Rey, abstract painter
 Charles Edward Ringling, one of the Ringling Brothers
 Stephen Root, actor, voice actor, and comedian
 Milton Rubenfeld (1919–2004), pilot and one of five founding pilots of Israeli Air Force
 Randy Savage (1952–2011), professional wrestler
 Sam Shields, cornerback in the National Football League
 George Snyder, Maryland state senator and majority leader
 Dick Smothers, actor, comedian, composer, and musician
 Jerry Springer, television personality
 Alex Steinweiss, graphic artist, credited with being the inventor of album cover art.
 Mildred Ladner Thompson, journalist and writer
 Dick Vitale, college basketball coach and broadcaster
 Adrienne Vittadini, fashion designer
 Joseph Volpe, general manager of the Metropolitan Opera
 Nik Wallenda, tightrope walker
 Iain Webb, Director of The Sarasota Ballet and former dancer with The Royal Ballet
 Scott Weiss, venture capitalist
 Hoyt Wilhelm, MLB pitcher and Baseball Hall of Fame inductee
 George Howard Williams, U.S Senator from Missouri
 Robert Windom, former Assistant Secretary for Health and Human Services under President Ronald Reagan
 Linda Winikow, politician and New York State Senator
 Roger Zare, composer and pianist
 Bridgett Zehr, ballet dancer with the English National Ballet

Sister cities

The U.S. sister city program began in 1956 when President Dwight D. Eisenhower proposed a people-to-people, citizen diplomacy initiative. The Sarasota chapter was established in 1963. A sister city, county, or state relationship is a broad-based, long-term partnership between two communities in two countries. A relationship is officially recognized after the highest elected or appointed official from both communities sign off on an agreement to become sister cities.

Sarasota's sister cities are:

 Perpignan, Pyrénées-Orientales, France (1994)
 Vladimir, Vladimir Oblast, Russia (1994)
 Tel Mond, Central District, Israel (1999)
 Dunfermline, Fife,  Scotland, UK (2001)
 Siming District, Xiamen, Fujian, China (2007)
 Mérida, Yucatán, México (2010)

Friendship cities
 Rapperswil-Jona, Kanton St. Gallen, Switzerland (2017)
 Busseto, Emilia-Romagna, Italy (2020)

See also 
 Newtown
 Sarasota Police Department

References

External links 

 
 

 
Cities in Florida
Cities in Sarasota County, Florida
County seats in Florida
Sarasota metropolitan area
Populated coastal places in Florida on the Gulf of Mexico